Alex Piara McGregor (born 7 June 1993) is a South African actress. She began her career as a child actress before gaining prominence through her role as Christine in the Spud films (2010–2014). Her work includes the films Impunity (2014) and Slumber Party Massacre (2021), the BBC docudrama The Gamechangers (2015), and the Syfy series Vagrant Queen (2020).

Early life
McGregor grew up in Sea Point, Cape Town. She has two older sisters Tamara and Laura, the latter of whom is an actress. McGregor was inspired to act when she watched her sister play Rizzo in a production of Grease and joined her drama rehearsal. Her cousins are the model sisters Kerry and Tracy McGregor. McGregor signed with Storm Models and Artistes Personal Management. She first appeared on screen in a commercial when she was 6, and made her television debut at age 11 in Charlie Jade.

Filmography

Film

Television

References

External links
 
 Alex McGregor at Artistes Personal Management (APM)

Living people
1993 births
21st-century South African actresses
Actresses from Cape Town
Child models
South African film actresses
South African television actresses
White South African people